Giles Hutchens (before 1556 – 21 February 1624) was an English politician.

Biography
Hutchens was mayor of Salisbury in 1592–1593. He was a Member (MP) of the Parliament of England for Salisbury in 1593 and 1597.

References

16th-century births
1624 deaths
English MPs 1593
English MPs 1597–1598
Mayors of Salisbury